Julius Ludwig Weisbach (born 10 August 1806 in Mittelschmiedeberg (now Mildenau Municipality), Erzgebirge, died 24 February 1871, Freiberg) was a German mathematician and engineer.

Life and work
Weisbach studied at the Bergakademie in Freiberg from 1822 - 1826. After that, he studied with Carl Friedrich Gauss in Göttingen and with Friedrich Mohs in Vienna.

In 1831 he returned to Freiberg where he worked as mathematics teacher at the local Gymnasium. In 1833 he became teacher for Mathematics and the Theory of Mountain Machines at the Freiberg Bergakademie. In 1836 he was promoted to Professor for applied mathematics, mechanics, theory of mountain machines and so-called Markscheidekunst.

Weisbach wrote an influential book for mechanical engineering students, called Lehrbuch der Ingenieur- und Maschinenmechanik, which has been expanded and reprinted on numerous occasions between 1845 and 1863.

He also refined the Darcy equation into the still widely used Darcy–Weisbach equation.

In 1868 he was elected a foreign member of the Royal Swedish Academy of Sciences.

Family 
His daughter Maria Camilla Weisbach (1835–1908) met Edward Carl Hegeler (1835–1910) when he was studying with her father at Freiberg and later married him on 5 April, 1860. The couple settled in LaSalle, Illinois, where Hegeler had set up the Matthiessen-Hegeler Zinc Company. Their daughter Mary Hegeler, later Carus, was born on 10 January 1861, the first of ten children. Mary worked alongside her father as a young girl and was the first woman to graduate from the University of Michigan with a bachelor's degree in engineering in 1882. In 1885 she became the first woman to be legally enrolled to study at her grandfather's university, Bergakademie Freiberg, following a letter of recommendation from her cousin Clemens Winkler.

Selected publications
Handbuch der Bergmaschinenmechanik (2 Bde., 1835/1836)
Lehrbuch der Ingenieur- und Maschinenmechanik (3 Bde., 1845/1863)
Der Ingenieur, Sammlung von Tafeln, Formeln und Regeln der Arithmetik, Geometrie und Mechanik (1848)
Die neue Markscheidekunst und ihre Anwendung auf die Anlage des Rothschönberger Stollns bei Freiberg (1851)
Anleitung zum axonometrischen Zeichnen (1857)

Notes

References

External links 

 
 

19th-century German mathematicians
Engineers from Saxony
University of Göttingen alumni
Members of the Royal Swedish Academy of Sciences
1806 births
1871 deaths
Scientists from Freiberg
Fluid dynamicists